The TCA Award for Outstanding Achievement in News and Information is an award given by the Television Critics Association.

Winners and nominees

Networks with multiple wins
PBS - 14
ABC - 6
CNN - 6
HBO - 3
Discovery Channel – 2
ESPN - 2
National Geographic Channel – 2

See also
Peabody Awards
Primetime Emmy Award for Outstanding Documentary or Nonfiction Series
Primetime Emmy Award for Outstanding Documentary or Nonfiction Special

References

External links
 Official website

News